Rudolf Pöder (3 February 1925, Vienna – 9 June 2013, Vienna) was an Austrian politician from Social Democratic Party. He was President of the National Council (1989–1990). His profession was aircraft engine mechanic.

References

2013 deaths
1925 births
Members of the National Council (Austria)
Presidents of the National Council (Austria)
Social Democratic Party of Austria politicians
Politicians from Vienna